The 2012–13 AJIHL season is the first season of the Australian Junior Ice Hockey League. It ran from 20 October 2012 until 17 February 2013, with the finals running from 3 March 2013 until 10 March 2013. The AJIHL is the highest Australian national junior ice hockey competition.

League business
On 18 September 2012 Ice Hockey Australia announced the formation of the Australian Junior Ice Hockey League with the league starting its inaugural season on 20 October 2012. On 22 September 2012 they announced that the league would consist of four teams for the first season – Melbourne Blackhawks, Melbourne Red Wings, Sydney Lightning and the Sydney Maple Leafs, with teams being operated by their respective state governing body, the Victorian Ice Hockey Association and the New South Wales Ice Hockey Association respectively. Games are set to be held in the Melbourne, Penrith and Sydney.

Following the games on 9 December 2012 there is an eight-week stoppage to allow for the festive period and for the 2013 IIHF World U20 Championships program which runs from December until the end of January.

Regular season
The regular season began on 20 October 2012 and ran through to 17 February 2013 before the teams compete in the playoff series.

October

November

December

February

Standings

Source

Player statistics

Scoring leaders
The following players led the league in regular season points.

Leading goaltenders
The following goaltenders led the league in regular season goals against average.

Playoffs
The 2013 playoffs started on 3 March 2013 with the final being held on 9 and 10 March 2013. Following the end of the regular season the teams will play their opposing state team in the semi-finals. The winners move on to play each other in a best-of-two final being held at the Medibank Icehouse in Melbourne. Melbourne Red Wings and Sydney Maple Leafs both progressed to the finals after winning their semi-final game. The Maple Leafs won the first game of the finals while the Red Wings won the second game tying the two game series. As a result, the two teams entered a sudden death overtime period. Scott Clemie scored the game-winning goal in the 13th minute of the period, with the Maple Leafs winning the first AJIHL season. Clemie was named the AJIHL Finals MVP.

Semi-finals

Final

References

External links
Ice Hockey Australia
AJIHL Coverage – Hewitt Sports

AJIHL
AJIHL
AJIHL
Australian Junior Ice Hockey League